The Roman Catholic Diocese of Ekiti is a diocese located in the city of Ado-Ekiti, Ekiti State in the Ecclesiastical province of Ibadan in Nigeria.

History
 July 30, 1972: Established as Diocese of Ado-Ekiti from the Diocese of Ondo
 December 11, 1972: Renamed as Diocese of Ekiti

Special churches
The Cathedral is St Patrick's Cathedral in Ado-Ekiti

Bishops
 Bishop of Ado-Ekiti (Roman rite) 
 Bishop Michael Patrick Olatunji Fagun (1972.07.30 - 1972.12.10 see below)
 Bishops of Ekiti (Roman rite)
 Bishop Michael Patrick Olatunji Fagun (see above 1972.12.11 - 2010.04.17)
 Bishop Felix Femi Ajakaye (2010.04.17 -)

Coadjutor Bishop
Felix Femi Ajakaye (2008-2010)

See also
Roman Catholicism in Nigeria

Sources
 Official Diocese of Ekiti website 
 GCatholic.org Information
 Catholic Hierarchy

Roman Catholic dioceses in Nigeria
Christian organizations established in 1972
Roman Catholic dioceses and prelatures established in the 20th century
Ekiti State
1972 establishments in Nigeria
Roman Catholic Ecclesiastical Province of Ibadan